Hesham Fathallah (born February 11, 1990) is an Egyptian professional footballer who currently plays as a central midfielder for the Egyptian club El Raja SC. Fathallah started his career with Smouha in youth level, and in 2015, he signed a 2-year contract for Pharco in a free transfer from Smouha, but he moved after one year to Petrojet where he played also only one year and then moved to El Raja SC, a promoted team to 2017–18 Egyptian Premier League.

During 2015–16 season in Egyptian Premier League, he got injured and suffered from a skull fracture after his collision with his teammate Ahmad El-Agooz.

References

External links
 

1990 births
Living people
El Raja SC players
Egyptian footballers
Association football midfielders
Smouha SC players
Petrojet SC players
Egyptian Premier League players